William Callaghan may refer to:
 William M. Callaghan (1897–1991), United States Navy officer
 Willie Callaghan (born 1943), Scottish footballer
 Willie Callaghan (footballer, born 1941), Scottish footballer (Aberdeen FC)
 Willie Callaghan (footballer, born 1967), Scottish footballer (Dunfermline Athletic, Walsall FC, Montrose FC, Livingston FC)
 Bill Callaghan (born 1948), British economist

See also
William O'Callaghan (disambiguation)
William Callahan (disambiguation)